The Guttersnipe is a 1922 American romance film directed by Dallas M. Fitzgerald and written by Wallace C. Clifton. The film stars Gladys Walton, Walter Perry, Kate Price, Jack Perrin, Sidney Franklin, and Carmen Phillips. The film was released on January 30, 1922, by Universal Film Manufacturing Company.

Cast          
Gladys Walton as Mazie O'Day
Walter Perry as Dennis O'Day
Kate Price as Mrs. O'Day
Jack Perrin as Tom Gilroy
Sidney Franklin as Sam Rosen
Carmen Phillips as Lady Clarissa
Edward Cecil as Lord Bart
Hugh Saxon as Angus
Seymour Zeliff as Red Galvin
Gino Corrado as Clarence Phillips 
Lorraine Weiler as Sally
Christian J. Frank as Gregory

References

External links

 

1922 films
American romance films
1920s romance films
Universal Pictures films
Films directed by Dallas M. Fitzgerald
American silent feature films
American black-and-white films
1920s English-language films
1920s American films